Solitary Men is a 1983 collaborative studio album by Italian producer Giorgio Moroder and Grammy-winning American singer Joe Esposito. Highlights from the album include a new arrangement of 'Nights in White Satin' by the Moody Blues and Lady, Lady, which appears in the films Flashdance and Call Me by Your Name.

Track listing

Personnel
Credits adapted from liner notes.

Musicians 
 Giorgio Moroder - synthesizer, arranger, composer, producer
 Joe Esposito - vocals
 Sylvester Levay - keyboards, synthesizer
 Richie Zito - bass, guitar
 Keith Forsey - drums, percussion
 Dino Solera - saxophone

Technical personnel 
 Laurie Kanner - producer
 Brian Gardner - mastering
 Brian Reeves - engineer
 Stephan Wissnet - engineer
 Ulli Rudolf - engineer
 Larry Vigon - art direction
 Jim Shea - photography

References

External links
 

1983 albums
Giorgio Moroder albums
Albums produced by Giorgio Moroder